Amity High School may refer to:

Amity Regional High School, Woodbridge, Connecticut
Amity High School (Oregon), Amity, Oregon

See also 
Brooklyn Amity School, Brooklyn, New York, a private school for students from kindergarten to grade 12
Amity International School (disambiguation)